The 2019–20 season will be Debreceni VSC's 42nd competitive season, 27th consecutive season in the OTP Bank Liga and 117th year in existence as a football club.

First team squad 

Source:

Transfers

Summer

In:

Out:

Source:

Winter

In:

Out:

Source:

Competitions

Overview

Nemzeti Bajnokság I

League table

Results summary

Results by round

Matches

Hungarian Cup

Europa League

First qualifying round

Second qualifying round

Statistics

Appearances and goals
Last updated on 27 June 2020.

|-
|colspan="14"|Youth players:

|-
|colspan="14"|Out to loan:

|-
|colspan="14"|Players no longer at the club:

|}

Top scorers
Includes all competitive matches. The list is sorted by shirt number when total goals are equal.
Last updated on 27 June 2020

Disciplinary record
Includes all competitive matches. Players with 1 card or more included only.

Last updated on 27 June 2020

Overall
{|class="wikitable"
|-
|Games played || 40 (33 OTP Bank Liga, 3 Hungarian Cup and 4 Europa League)
|-
|Games won || 14 (11 OTP Bank Liga, 2 Hungarian Cup and 1 Europa League)
|-
|Games drawn || 8 (6 OTP Bank Liga, 1 Hungarian Cup and 1 Europa League)
|-
|Games lost || 18 (16 OTP Bank Liga, 0 Hungarian Cup and 2 Europa League)
|-
|Goals scored || 59
|-
|Goals conceded || 66
|-
|Goal difference || -7
|-
|Yellow cards || 92
|-
|Red cards || 3
|-
|rowspan="1"|Worst discipline ||  Ákos Kinyik (14 , 0 )
|-
|rowspan="2"|Best result || 4–0 (H) v Újpest - Nemzeti Bajnokság I - 25-1-2020
|-
| 4–0 (H) v Diósgyőr - Nemzeti Bajnokság I - 21-6-2020
|-
||Worst result || 1–6 (H) v Ferencváros - Nemzeti Bajnokság I - 10-11-2019
|-
|rowspan="1"|Most appearances ||  János Ferenczi (37 appearances)
|-
|rowspan="1"|Top scorer ||  Tunde Adeniji (12 goals)
|-
|Points || 49/120 (40.83%)
|-

Attendances

List of the home matches:

References

External links
 Official Website 
 UEFA
 fixtures and results

Debreceni VSC seasons
Debrecen